The 2nd Foreign Parachute Battalion was a parachute battalion of the Foreign Legion in the French Army initially composed of volunteers of the 4th Demi-Brigade of the Foreign Legion (4e D.B.L.E).

History, creation and different nomination designations

 2e Bataillon Etranger de Parachutistes, 2e BEP 

The 2nd Foreign Parachute Battalion was created on October 1, 1948, by execution of a ministerial prescription dating to March 27, 1948. The combat companies of the 2e BEP were constituted by the 4th Demi-Brigade of the Foreign Legion (4e D.B.L.E) in Morocco and the depot of the foreign regiments in Sidi-bel-Abbès, were assigned by the 25th Airborne Division Element. Composed of one command company and three combat companies type fusiliers-voltigeurs, the battalion makes and clears way to Oran on January 19, 1949, destined for Indochina. Disembarked in Saïgon on February 9, the battalion is directed to Kep (Cambodia) by land route. In November 1949, the battalion takes base in Quan Thé.

The first combat engagements of the 2e BEP have for theatre of operations, Cambodia, Cochinchine and Annam. In October 1950, the 2e BEP is summoned to Tonkin. Reinforced by a heavy mortars company, the battalion engages in all military operations in the Delta, in Thaï lands, Mékong and the plains of Jarres. The impressive series of combat engagements are earned at the battle of Nghia Lo, colonial route N°6 (RC6), Hoa Binh and the defense of the camp by an airborne operation on Langson. Crowned of a magnificent epoque, the 2e BEP makes and clears way to Dien Bien Phu on April 9 and 10 of 1954 in the middle of the furnace.  Following the couter-attack of supporting point "Huguet", led by a rare determination during the night of the 22 and 23 of April; the 2e BEP and the 1st Foreign Parachute Battalion (1er B.E.P) merge to form a single foreign marching battalion. On May 7, the foreign marching battalion is dissolved and the 2e BEP is recreated by members of the 3rd Foreign Parachute Battalion. On June 1, 1954, the 2e BEP leaves Asia on November 1, 1955.  The colors of the battalion are decorated with 6 citations at the orders of the armed forces and the fourragère of the colors of the Legion of Honor.  The losses of the 2e BEP rises to 1500 Legion officers, warrant officers, non-commissioned officers and Legionnaires killed along with their "chef de corps", Legion commandant Barthélémy Rémy Raffali leading and heading a traditional Foreign Legion battlefield.  Returned to Algeria, the 2nd Foreign Parachute Battalion (2e BEP) becomes the 2nd Foreign Parachute Regiment on December 1, 1955.

The insignia of the 2nd Foreign Parachute Battalion was created in 1949, in Cambodia. The battalion insignia represents an eastern winged dragon making reference to the original implementation in Asia. The three point triangular shape of the insignia represents the form of an open Parachute; center by the flag colors of the legion; and is symbol of the perfection that is expected of the men serving this regiment. The battalion was commanded at the time by commandant Solnon (1948-1950).

Organization

Traditions

Insignias 
The insignia of the French metropolitan Paratroopers represents a closed "winged armed dextrochere", meaning a "right winged arm" armed with a sword pointing upwards. The Insignia makes reference to the Patron of Paratroopers. In fact, the Insignia represents "the right Arm of Saint Michael", the Archangel which according to Liturgy is the "Armed Arm of God". This Insignia is the symbol of righteous combat and fidelity to superior missions.

Battalion Colors

Battalion Song

Decorations

Honours

Battle honours

Battalion Commanders

Notable Officers and Legionnaires
Paul Arnaud de Foïard
Rémy Raffalli
Hélie de Saint Marc

See also 

 Major (France)
 French Foreign Legion Music Band (MLE)

References

Parachute Battalion 02
Military units and formations established in 1948
Military units and formations disestablished in 1955